Wivan Pettersson (24 January 1904 – 7 November 1976) was a Swedish swimmer. She won a bronze medal in 4 × 100 m freestyle relay at the 1924 Summer Olympics, along with Aina Berg, Gurli Ewerlund and Hjördis Töpel. Individually she finished fourth in the 200 m breaststroke and failed to reach the 100 m freestyle final. In 1925 she set two Swedish records in the 200 m breaststroke.

References

1904 births
1976 deaths
Olympic swimmers of Sweden
Swimmers at the 1924 Summer Olympics
Olympic bronze medalists for Sweden
Olympic bronze medalists in swimming
Swedish female freestyle swimmers
Swedish female breaststroke swimmers
Medalists at the 1924 Summer Olympics
People from Eskilstuna
Sportspeople from Södermanland County
20th-century Swedish women